Robert Andrew Simms (born 26 March 1984) is an Australian politician, representing the Greens South Australia. He was a Senator for South Australia from 2015 to 2016, an Area Councillor for the City of Adelaide from 2014 to 2015 and from 2018 to 2021. Since May 2021, he has been a member of the South Australian Legislative Council.

Early life
Simms was born on 26 March 1984 in Yorkshire, England, the son of an English father and Australian mother originally from Broken Hill, New South Wales. The family moved to Australia in 1987 and settled in Adelaide, South Australia. Simms attended primary school in Flagstaff Hill before going on to Aberfoyle Park High School, where he was a member of the debating club and served on the student council. He holds a Bachelor of Laws and Legal Practice (Honours), a Bachelor of Arts (majoring in politics and sociology) and a Graduate Certificate in Journalism.  he was partway through a PhD in political philosophy at Flinders University where he has also taught in the politics department.

In 2008 Simms was admitted as a barrister and solicitor. He has worked in the community sector as a policy advocate, serving on the boards of a number of community organisations including the Youth Affairs Council and AIDS Council of South Australia. He has also worked as a radio journalist and freelance writer.

Political career

Early career 
Simms stood as a candidate for the Australian Democrats in the seat of Boothby at the 2004 federal election. He later stood for the Greens in Enfield at the 2010 state election, and Adelaide in the 2014 state election. He was elected as an Adelaide councillor in 2014 and was a co-convenor of the SA Greens in 2015. He resigned from the Council on 8 September 2015 to fill the vacancy caused by Penny Wright's resignation from the Senate.

Senate career 
Simms was a Greens member of the Senate, representing the state of South Australia, from 22 September 2015 until his defeat at the 2016 election. Until the appointment of James Paterson to the Senate in March 2016, he was the youngest serving senator and the second-youngest sitting MP (after Wyatt Roy).

As a senator, Simms was the Greens parliamentary spokesperson on higher education, LGBT rights and marriage equality—portfolios previously held by Senators Lee Rhiannon and Janet Rice.

Simms was one of five openly-LGBTI members in the Parliament of Australia and supports marriage equality in Australia.

State politics and return to city council 
After his defeat in 2016, Simms was the Greens' candidate for Adelaide again at the 2018 state election, and received 12.6% of the first preference votes (third of four candidates). He was re-elected to City of Adelaide Council in 2018. In 2021, he resigned from council for the second time, to fill a casual vacancy caused by the resignation of Mark Parnell. Simms' previous resignation from Adelaide Council was to fill a casual vacancy in the Senate, caused by the resignation of Parnell's wife, Penny Wright.

References

External links
 

1984 births
Living people
Australian barristers
South Australian local councillors
Australian republicans
Academic staff of Flinders University
Flinders University alumni
Gay politicians
Australian gay writers
Australian Greens members of the Parliament of Australia
Members of the Australian Senate
Members of the Australian Senate for South Australia
Members of the South Australian Legislative Council
Australian Greens members of the Parliament of South Australia
LGBT legislators in Australia
English emigrants to Australia
21st-century Australian politicians